Haeinsa (해인사, 海印寺: Temple of the Ocean Mudra) is a head temple of the Jogye Order (대한불교조계종, 大韓佛敎 曹溪宗) of Korean Seon Buddhism in Gayasan National Park (가야산, 伽倻山), South Gyeongsang Province, South Korea. Haeinsa is most notable for being the home of the Tripitaka Koreana, the whole of the Buddhist Scriptures carved onto 81,350 wooden printing blocks, which it has housed since 1398.

Haeinsa is one of the Three Jewels Temples, and represents Dharma or the Buddha’s teachings. It is still an active Seon (선, 禪) practice center in modern times, and was the home temple of the influential Seon master Seongcheol (성철, 性徹), who died in 1993.

History
The temple was first built in 802. Legend says that two monks of royal Daegaya descent, Suneung and Ijeong, returned from China and healed Aejang of Silla's wife of her illness. In gratitude for Gautama Buddha's mercy, the king ordered the construction of the temple.  Another account, by Choe Chi-Won in 900 states that Suneung and his disciple Ijeong, gained the support of a queen dowager who converted to Buddhism and then helped to finance the construction of the temple.

The temple complex was renovated in the 10th century, 1488, 1622, and 1644.  Huirang, the temple abbot enjoyed the patronage of Taejo of Goryeo during that king’s reign.  Haeinsa was burned down in a fire in 1817 and was rebuilt in 1818.  Another renovation in 1964 uncovered a royal robe of Gwanghaegun of Joseon, who was responsible for the 1622 renovation, and an inscription on a ridge beam.

The main hall, Daejeokkwangjeon (대적광전, 大寂光殿: Hall of Great Silence and Light), is unusual because it is dedicated to Vairocana, whereas most other Korean temples house images of Gautama Buddha in their main halls.

The Temple of Haeinsa and the Depositories for the Tripiṭaka Koreana Woodblocks were made a UNESCO World Heritage Site in 1995. The UNESCO committee noted that the buildings housing the Tripiṭaka Koreana are unique because no other historical structure was specifically dedicated to the preservation of artifacts and the techniques used were particularly ingenious.

The temple also holds several official treasures including a realistic wooden carving of a monk and interesting Buddhist paintings, stone pagodas, and lanterns.

Crisis

After independence, when the Korean War broke out, Haeinsa encountered a crisis. In September 1951, after the Battle of Inchon, South Korea turned the war around but then North Korea did not retreat so the  remnants of one thousand North Korean soldiers around Haeinsa engaged in guerrilla warfare. UN forces were  ordered to bomb Haeinsa with four bombers.

Janggyeong Panjeon (National Treasure No.32)

The storage halls known as the Janggyeong Panjeon complex are the depository for the Tripiṭaka Koreana woodblocks at Haeinsa and were also designated by the Korean government as a National Treasure on December 20, 1962. They are some of the largest wooden storage facilities in the world. Remarkably, the halls were untouched during the Japanese invasions of Korea (1592–98) and were spared from the 1818 fire that burned most of the temple complex down.  All told, the storage halls have survived seven serious fires and one near-bombing during the Korean War when a pilot disobeyed orders because he remembered that the temple held priceless treasures.

Janggyeong Panjeon complex is the oldest part of the temple and houses the 81,258 wooden printing blocks from the Tripiṭaka Koreana. Although the exact construction date of the hall that houses the Tripiṭaka  Koreana is uncertain, it is believed that Sejo of Joseon expanded and renovated it in 1457. The complex is made up of four halls arranged in a rectangle and the style is very plain because of its use as a storage facility.  The northern hall is called Beopbojeon (Hall of Dharma) and the southern hall is called the Sudara-jang ("Hall of Sutras"). These two main halls are 60.44 meters in length, 8.73 meters in width, and 7.8 meters in height. Both have fifteen rooms with two adjoining rooms.  Additionally, there are two small halls on the east and west which house two small libraries.

Several ingenious preservation techniques are utilized to preserve the wooden printing blocks. The architects also utilized nature to help preserve the Tripitaka.  The storage complex was built at the highest point of the temple and is 655 meters above sea level. Janggyeong Panjeon faces southwest to avoid damp southeasterly winds from the valley below and is blocked from the cold north wind by mountain peaks.  Different sized windows on the north and south sides of both main halls are used for ventilation, utilizing principles of hydrodynamics. The windows were installed in every hall to maximize ventilation and regulate temperature. The clay floors were filled with charcoal, calcium oxide, salt, lime, and sand, which reduce humidity when it rains by absorbing excess moisture which is then retained during  the dry winter months. The roof is also made with clay and the bracketing and wood rafters prevent sudden changes in temperature. Additionally, no part of the complex is exposed to sun. Apparently, animals, insects, and birds avoid the complex but the reason for this is unknown. These sophisticated preservation measures are widely credited as the reason the woodblocks have survived in such fantastic condition to this day.

In 1970, a modern storage complex was built utilizing modern preservation techniques but when test woodblocks were found to have mildewed, the intended move was canceled and the woodblocks remained at Haeinsa.

Tourism 
It also offers Temple Stay programs where visitors can experience Buddhist culture.

Gallery

See also
 Korean Buddhist temples
 Korean Buddhism
 Korean temple cuisine
 Temple Stay
 Three Jewel Temples of Korea

References

External links 

Official website (Korean language)
Asian Historical Architecture: Haeinsa
South Korean Cultural Properties Administration page for Haeinsa and Tripitaka Koreana
Digital Dictionary of Buddhism (log in as "guest")
UNESCO: Haeinsa Temple Janggyeong Panjeon
Cultural Heritage: Haeinsa Janggyeong Panjeon
Haeinsa Temple on VisitKorea.or.kr 

Buddhist temples of the Jogye Order
Religious organizations established in the 9th century
Buddhist temples in South Korea
Buildings and structures in South Gyeongsang Province
National Treasures of South Korea
World Heritage Sites in South Korea
Tourist attractions in South Gyeongsang Province
9th-century establishments in Korea
Religious buildings and structures completed in 802